(There's) No Place Like Home may refer to:

Books
No Place Like Home, a 2003 novel by Barbara Samuel
 No Place Like Home (novel), a 2005 novel by Mary Higgins Clark

Film and TV

Film
 "There's no place like home," a quote from the 1939 film The Wizard of Oz
 No Place Like Home (1989 film), a CBS TV movie directed by Lee Grant
 No Place Like Home (2001 film), a film written and directed by Craig Clyde
 No Place Like Home (2006 film), a documentary film directed by Courtney Fathom Sell
 There's No Place Like Home (film), an Italian film

Television
 No Place Like Home (TV series), an early-mid 1980s BBC TV sitcom
 "No Place Like Home" (Buffy the Vampire Slayer), a 2000 episode of the television series Buffy the Vampire Slayer
 "No Place Like Home" (Rugrats episode), a 2000 episode of the television series Rugrats
 No Place Like Home (audio drama), a 2003 Doctor Who audio-drama
 "No Place Like Home" (Wentworth), a 2013 episode of Wentworth Prison
 "There's No Place Like Home" (Lost), a 2008 episode of the television series Lost
 "There's No Place Like Home" (Once Upon a Time), a 2014 episode of the television series Once Upon a Time

Music
 No Place Like Home (Big Country album), 1991
 No Place Like Home (Doug Stanhope album), 2016

Songs
 "There's no place like home," the last line of the 1822 song "Home! Sweet Home!"
 "(There's No Place Like) Home for the Holidays", a 1954 Christmas song most famously sung by Perry Como
 "No Place Like Home" (Squeeze song), 1985
 "No Place Like Home" (Randy Travis song), 1986
 "No Place Like Home", a song on the 1992 album Bigger, Better, Faster, More! by 4 Non Blondes
 "No Place Like Home", a song on the 2005 album Suspended Animation Dreams by Subterranean Masquerade
 "No Place Like Home", a song on the 2010 album Something for Everybody by Devo
 "No Place Like Home", a song on the 2011 album Ever After by Marianas Trench
 "No Place Like Home" (Primal Rock Rebellion song), 2012
 "No Place Like Home", a song on the 2015 album Austin & Ally: Take It from the Top by Ross Lynch & Laura Marano
 "No Place Like Home", a song from Straight Outta Oz by Todrick Hall